Sporting is a neighborhood in Alexandria, Egypt. The area is most famous for hosting the sport club by the same name, which is also referred to as the "Alexandria Sporting Club".

Transport 
The Alexandria tram has two stops in Sporting, one station called Sporting El Soghra, and the other one simply called Sporting.

See also 

 Neighborhoods in Alexandria

Neighbourhoods of Alexandria